Richard B. Frankel is an Emeritus Professor of Physics at the California State Polytechnic University, San Luis Obispo. He is noted for his research on magnetotaxis and biomineralization of magnetic iron minerals in general and magnetotactic bacteria in particular. His expertise in the latter was prominently discussed in Stephen Jay Gould's The Panda's Thumb (1980 Chapter 30). He is a graduate of the University of Missouri (1961) and took a PhD from Berkeley (1965). Much of his career was spent at the Francis Bitter National Magnet Laboratory, Massachusetts Institute of Technology before joining Cal Poly in 1988.

He is a fellow of the American Physical Society.

Selected publications

References

Other sources

Year of birth missing (living people)
Living people
American biophysicists
21st-century American physicists
Experimental physicists
University of Missouri alumni
University of Missouri physicists
University of California, Berkeley alumni
Fellows of the American Physical Society